Beclometasone/formoterol, sold under the brand name Fostair, is an inhalable fixed-dose combination drug for the treatment of asthma and chronic obstructive pulmonary disease (COPD). It contains beclometasone dipropionate and formoterol fumarate dihydrate. It is inhaled.

It was approved for medical use in the United Kingdom in 2007, and in Australia in February 2020. It is on the World Health Organization's List of Essential Medicines.

References

External links 
 
 

Antiasthmatic drugs
Beta-adrenergic agonists
Bronchodilators
Combination drugs
Corticosteroid esters
Glucocorticoids